Joseph Henry Cock (25 January 1855 – 9 September 1921) was a New Zealand shipping company manager and patron of the arts. He was born in Calstock, Cornwall, England on 25 January 1855.

References

1855 births
1921 deaths
English emigrants to New Zealand
New Zealand philanthropists